The 1956 New Year Honours in New Zealand were appointments by Elizabeth II on the advice of the New Zealand government to various orders and honours to reward and highlight good works by New Zealanders. The awards celebrated the passing of 1955 and the beginning of 1956, and were announced on 2 January 1956.

The recipients of honours are displayed here as they were styled before their new honour.

Knight Bachelor
 William Walter Mulholland  – of Canterbury. For services to farming.

Order of Saint Michael and Saint George

Knight Commander (KCMG)
 The Honourable Thomas Clifton Webb  – high commissioner in the United Kingdom, formerly Attorney-General and Minister of External Affairs.

Companion (CMG)
 Charles Phipp Agar  – of Christchurch. For services to local government and the dairy industry.
 George Douglas Robb  – a consulting surgeon, of Auckland.

Order of the British Empire

Dame Commander (DBE)
Civil division
 The Honourable Grace Hilda Ross – Minister for the Welfare of Women and Children.

Commander (CBE)
Civil division
 William Percival Evans – professor of chemistry, Canterbury University College.
 David Masson Greig – Director-General of Lands.
 Colonel John Llewellyn Saunders   – director of Dental Hygiene.
 Henry Devenish Skinner  – director of the Otago Museum and lecturer in anthropology at Otago University.

Military division
 Brigadier Monty Claude Fairbrother   – Royal New Zealand Infantry Corps (Territorial Force).

Officer (OBE)
Civil division
 Adam Laurence Adamson – mayor of Invercargill.
 Lewis Alfred Eady. For services to the community in Auckland, especially as a city councillor.
 Richard John Burnside Hall  – medical superintendent, Cook Hospital, Gisborne.
 William Henry Hall – of Timaru. For public services.
 Robert Harding  – of Hastings. For services to local government.
 Pateriki Joseph Hura – of Taumarunui. For services to the Māori people, especially as a member of the Board of Māori Affairs.
 John Guy Marshall – of Wellington. For services to the manufacturing industry. 
 Thomas Arthur McCormack – a prominent artist, of Wellington.
 Peter Munro – assistant commissioner of Police, and a member of the Police Commission.
 Gwendoline Mabel Underwood – formerly a member of the staff of the District Nursing Department.
 The Reverend Canon Henry Williams – of Christchurch. For services to the community.

Military division
 The Venerable Archdeacon Gordon Melville McKenzie  – honorary chaplain, Royal New Zealand Naval Volunteer Reserve.
 Lieutenant-Colonel Duncan MacIntyre  – Royal New Zealand Armoured Corps (Territorial Force).
 Wing Commander Bruce Roden Furkert – Royal New Zealand Air Force.

Member (MBE)
Civil division
 John David Allingham – a prominent architect, of Dunedin.
 Archibald Banks. For services in connection with the development of prison farms.
 Maud Ruby Basham. For services in the fields of entertainment and broadcasting.
 Janet Clark Buchanan. For philanthropic services in Taranaki.
 Beatrice Alice Ann Downes – of Te Awamutu. For municipal and social welfare services.
 Oswald Lovell Ferens  – of Dunedin. For services to ex-servicemen.
 Elinor Styles Harvey – formerly matron, Wairoa Hospital.
 Patrick Francis Higgins – chairman, Napier Harbour Board.
 Lucy Atareti Jacob. For services to the Māori people in the Levin and Ōtaki districts.
 James Mercer. For services to sport, particularly lawn tennis.
 William Parsonage. For services to the coal-mining industry.
 Alfred Henry Pettitt – of Dunedin. For services to the community as a musician.
 Charles Bradlaugh Ross – conductor of the Hokitika Municipal Band for 40 years.
 Dorothy Snell – of Whangārei. For social welfare services.
 Ray Watts – of Christchurch. For social welfare services.
 Edmund David White – chairman, Matamata County Council.
 Catherine Maxwell Williams  – of Auckland. For social welfare services.

Military division
 Lieutenant-Commander Thomas Alexander Simpson – Royal New Zealand Navy.
 Captain Hamish Coates Neale – Royal New Zealand Army Medical Corps (Territorial Force).
 Major Leslie Arthur Pearce – New Zealand Regiment (Regular Force).
 Major (temporary) Stanley Melvin Pritchard – Royal New Zealand Infantry Corps (Territorial Force).
 Flight Lieutenant Noel Herbert Scott – Air Training Corps, Royal New Zealand Air Force.
 Warrant Officer Stephen Raymond Hooker – Royal New Zealand Air Force.
 Warrant Officer Herman Andrew Payne – Royal New Zealand Air Force.

British Empire Medal (BEM)
Military division
 Chief Petty Officer John Willis Barnes – Royal New Zealand Navy.
 Chief Petty Officer John Curtis Harman – Royal New Zealand Navy.
 Chief Shipwright Artificer John Norman Jones – Royal New Zealand Navy.
 Chief Yeoman of Signals Henry Richard Moon – Royal New Zealand Navy.
 Staff-Sergeant Peter King Christian – Royal New Zealand Armoured Corps (Regular Force).
 Sergeant James Dixon – Royal New Zealand Army Service Corps (Regular Force).
 Flight Sergeant Eric William Metcalf – Royal New Zealand Air Force.
 Sergeant John William Noble – Royal New Zealand Air Force.

References

New Year Honours
1956 awards
1956 in New Zealand
New Zealand awards